The 1975–76 season was the first time Tennis Borussia Berlin played in the 2. Bundesliga, the second highest tier of the German football league system. After 38 league games, Tennis Borussia finished top of the division and were promoted back to the Bundesliga after one season as league champions. The club reached the third round of the DFB-Pokal; losing 3–0 away to FC Bayern München. Norbert Stolzenburg scored 27 of the club's 86 league goals and in doing so, became the top scorer of the 1975–76 2. Bundesliga Nord.

1975–76 Tennis Borussia Berlin squad

1975–76 fixtures

Player statistics

Final league position – 1st

References

External links 
 1975–76 Tennis Borussia Berlin season – squad and statistics at fussballdaten.de 

Tennis Borussia Berlin seasons
German football clubs 1975–76 season